, known professionally as , is a South Korean-Japanese rapper and pop musician. She debuted in 2016 independently, before releasing her major label debut album Miseinen in 2017.

Biography 

Chanmina was born in South Korea, to a Japanese father and Korean mother, and lived in Korea until she was three years old. As her mother is a professional ballerina, she spent her childhood traveling around Korea, Japan and the United States. Due to her mother's influence, Chanmina learned ballet and violin from a young age.

During this time in her life, she discovered the song "Day by Day" (2008) by Korean band Big Bang, and felt moved by the song, inspiring her to become a rapper. Chanmina originally planned to move to South Korea to become a K-Pop musician in her second year of high school, however her friend, female rapper Messhi, convinced her to stay in Japan. She first came to fame after participating in the 2016 , a high school rap competition broadcast on BS Sky Perfect!, and her independently released debut single "Miseinen" (featuring Messhi on the track), managed to top iTunes Japan's hip-hop song rankings chart.

Her first major label debut single "Fxxker" was released in 2017, followed by her debut album Miseinen (2017). In the same year, Chanmina released the extended play Chocolate, which was recorded in Los Angeles. The following year, Chanmina switched labels to Warner Music Japan. The title song from her second album Never Grow Up was used as the theme song for the Japanese drama Jigoku no Girlfriend and became a sleeper hit, reaching over 10 million views on YouTube eight months after the song's release, and receiving a gold certification for streaming from the RIAJ.

In September 2021, Chanmina's song "I'm a Pop" was featured in the Netflix film Kate, leading the song to chart in the United States on the Billboard World Digital Songs chart. Chanmina released her third studio album, Harenchi in October, featuring "Voice Memo No. 5", "Picky", "Angel" and "Bijin"; songs she had released as singles or as leading tracks from extended plays in 2020 and 2021.

Chanmina released her first full-length Korean single "Don't go" feat. Ash Island on September 23, 2022.

Personal life

Chanmina is trilingual, and speaks Korean, Japanese and English.

Discography

Studio albums

Extended plays

Singles

As lead artist

As featured artist

Promotional singles

Guest appearances

Notes

References

External links 

 Official website
 

1998 births
21st-century Japanese singers
21st-century Japanese women singers
English-language singers from Japan
Japanese women hip hop musicians
Japanese women singer-songwriters
Japanese singer-songwriters
Japanese-language singers
Japanese people of Korean descent
Japanese rappers
Korean-language singers of Japan
Living people
Musicians from Tokyo
People from Nerima
South Korean women rappers
South Korean women singer-songwriters
South Korean singer-songwriters
South Korean people of Japanese descent
Victor Entertainment artists
Warner Music Japan artists